Cuthbert Pepper (died 1608), of East Cowton, near Richmond, Yorkshire, was an English politician.

He was a Member (MP) of the Parliament of England for Richmond, Yorkshire in 1597 and 1601.

References

16th-century births
1608 deaths
English MPs 1597–1598
English MPs 1601